Križ is a village in the Municipality of Sežana in the Littoral region of Slovenia, close to the border with Italy.

Church

The church in the settlement is dedicated to the Holy Cross and belongs to the Parish of Tomaj.

References

External links

Križ on Geopedia

Populated places in the Municipality of Sežana